Yuraq Kancha (Quechua yuraq white, kancha corral, enclosure, frame, also spelled Yuraccancha) is a mountain in the Cordillera Central in the Andes of Peru which reaches a height of approximately . It is located in the Junín Region, Jauja Province, Canchayllo District.

References 

Mountains of Peru
Mountains of Junín Region